Thomas, Tommy, or Tom Hammond may refer to:
Thomas Hammond (athlete) (1878–1945), British track and field athlete
Thomas Hammond (merchant) (1630–1681), English-born Norwegian merchant and landowner
Thomas Hammond (politician) (1843–1909), U.S. Representative from Indiana
Thomas Hammond (regicide) (c. 1600–1658), officer in the New Model Army and a regicide
Thomas Hammond (field hockey) (born 1984), South African field hockey player
Thomas S. Hammond (1883–1950), American business and political leader, soldier and football player and coach
T. C. Hammond (Thomas Chatterton Hammond, 1877–1961), Irish Anglican cleric
Tom Hammond (born 1944), American sportscaster 
Tom Hammond (footballer) (1896–1966), Australian rules footballer for Collingwood
Tommy Hammond, South African field hockey player

See also
 Tom Hammonds (born 1967), American professional basketball player and drag racer